Too Late to Load (subtitled (The Unissued, Unavailable And Ultra Rare LRB Masters, 1975 - 1986)) is an Australian-only rarities compilation album by Australian band Little River Band, released in 1988.

Background
While reviewing tracks for a Little River Band greatest hits collection, Glenn A. Baker and Graham Goble discovered many tracks which had been overlooked for earlier studio albums.

Track listing 
"When Will I Be Loved" (1975) (P. Everly) - 2:50
"D" (1983)  (B. Birtles/G. Goble) - 3:03
"Gunslinger" (1976) (G. Shorrock) - 4:47
"Please Don't Ask Me" (1982) (G. Goble) - 3:17
"The Shut Out" (1985) (G. Goble) - 2:50
"One Day" (1986) (G. Goble) - 2:39
"Love Letters" - live (1983) (V. Young/E. Heyman) - 3:07
"Stormy Surrender" (1985) (G. Goble) - 4:53
"What Ya Thinka Me" (1978) (G. Goble/B. Birtles) - 3:37
"Tender Betrayal" (1986) (G. Goble) - 4:41
"The Butterfly" - instrumental (1985) (trad., arr. Little River Band) - 2:33
"Chip Off the Old Block" (1975) (G. Shorrock) - 2:54
"Good Wine"

References

Little River Band albums
1988 compilation albums
EMI Records compilation albums